Generation Gifted is a British documentary television series that was first broadcast on BBC Two between 14 and 15 February 2018. The six-part series takes a unique look at social mobility and the factors which affect it in Britain today, by filming with six highly promising children, who are all from families on low incomes. Transmitting two 60 minute episodes each year from 2018, the series will explore the "challenges facing these children, as they progress from ages 13 to 16 and sit their GCSEs. Whether they’re talented mathematicians, show a flair for literature or are flourishing artists, these kids all have the potential to go far".

Production 
The series was commissioned by Patrick Holland, Channel Controller, BBC Two, Clare Sillery, Head of Commissioning, Documentaries, and Danny Horan, Commissioning Editor for Documentaries.

Episodes

Series 1

Episode 1 : Girls 
Original air date: 14 February 2018

In Port Talbot, Anne-Marie wants to go to university but suffers from anxiety. In Tamworth, talented artist Shakira is pushed to find her creative voice. Financial problems may harm Jada's hopes.

Episode 2: Boys 
Original air date: 15 February 2018

We meet three 13-year-old boys facing many uncertainties. In the North-East Kian and Liam both struggle under the weight of expectations. In London, Jamarley's future is hindered by problems at home.

Series 2

Episode 3: Boys 
Original air date: 18 February 2019

Episode 4: Girls 
Original air date: 25 February 2019

Series 3

Episode 3: Boys 
Original air date: 25 March 2020

Episode 4: Girls 
Original air date: 1 April 2020

See also
Educating (TV series)
Our School (TV series)
Undercover Teacher
Harrow: A Very British School

References

External links
 

2018 British television series debuts
2020 British television series endings
2010s British reality television series
2020s British reality television series
BBC television documentaries
English-language television shows